Bhagwati may refer to:

Surname
 Jagdish Bhagwati (born 1934), India-born, naturalized American economist
 P. N. Bhagwati (born 1921), 17th Chief Justice of India
 Sandeep Bhagwati (born 1963), German-Indian composer of western classical music

Given name
 Bhagwati Devi (born 1936), politician, social worker, Member of Parliament 
 Bhagwati Prasad (politician) (died 2013), Indian politician who was elected MLA twice
 Bhagwati Singh, politician from Samajwadi Party, Member of the Parliament of India
 Bhagwati Charan Verma (1903–1981), author in Hindi
 Bhagwati Charan Vohra (1904–1930), Indian revolutionary

See also
 Kalinchowk Bhagwati Shrine in Dolkha District of Nepal
 Bhagwati Temple, Hindu temple in the heart of Rajbiraj, Saptari
 Bhagwat (surname), surname page
 Bhagwat (disambiguation)
 Bhagyawati, 1888 novel in Hindi by Shardha Ram Phillauri

Indian given names
Indian surnames